The Sulawesi scops owl (Otus manadensis) is an owl found on the Sulawesi island of Indonesia.

The Banggai scops owl (Otus mendeni) was formerly considered conspecific, but was split as a distinct species by the IOC in 2021.

References

External links

Sulawesi scops owl
Endemic birds of Sulawesi
Sulawesi scops owl
Taxa named by Jean René Constant Quoy
Taxa named by Joseph Paul Gaimard